Kim Min-kyu (born 24 March 2001), also known as Minkyu Kim, is a South Korean professional golfer. Aged 17, he won the 2018 D+D Real Czech Challenge on the Challenge Tour becoming the youngest-ever winner on the tour.

Professional career
Kim turned professional in early 2017 and won his first professional event on the Jamega Pro Golf Tour at the Windmill Hill Classic. Following this, Kim then played on the 2017 PGA EuroPro Tour. He won two tournaments in successive weeks in August, the Pentahotels Championship and FORE Business Championship. He was runner-up in the end-of-season Tour Championship Amendoeira Golf Resort and finished second in the Order of Merit to earn a place on the Challenge Tour for 2018.

In June 2022, Kim won the Kolon Korea Open; a co-sanctioned Asian Tour and Korean Tour event. He beat Cho Min-gyu in a three-hole aggregate playoff.

Professional wins (5)

Asian Tour wins (1)

1Co-sanctioned by the Korean Tour

Asian Tour playoff record (1–0)

Challenge Tour wins (1)

Korean Tour wins (1)

1Co-sanctioned by the Asian Tour

PGA EuroPro Tour wins (2)

Jamega Pro Golf Tour (1)

*Note: The 2017 Windmill Hill Classic was shortened to 18 holes due to rain.

Results in major championships

CUT = missed the half-way cut

References

External links

South Korean male golfers
Sportspeople from Gyeonggi Province
People from Gwangju, Gyeonggi
2001 births
Living people